Thomas J. Mangan (March 12, 1926 – October 28, 1998) was an American politician and educator.

Mangan was born in Milwaukee, Wisconsin. He served in the United States Navy Reserve during World War II. Mangan graduated from University of Wisconsin in 1950. He went to University of Minnesota for graduated studies and then received his master's degree from University of Michigan in 1956. Mangan lived in Anoka, Minnesota with his wife and family and was a director for special education in the Anoka Hennepin School District. He served as a hearing consultant for the Minnesota Department of Education. Mangan served in the Minnesota House of Representatives from 1975 to 1978 and was a Democrat.

References

1926 births
1998 deaths
Military personnel from Milwaukee
Politicians from Milwaukee
People from Anoka, Minnesota
Educators from Minnesota
University of Minnesota alumni
University of Michigan alumni
University of Wisconsin alumni
Democratic Party members of the Minnesota House of Representatives